Jean-Luc Garnier (born 22 May 1961) is a French former professional racing cyclist. He rode in the 1984 Tour de France.

References

External links

1961 births
Living people
French male cyclists
Sportspeople from Gard